This is a list of the oldest documented football competitions, played at school, club, national and international levels. The first list contains competitions that have been played continuously. The second is a list of competitions that are now defunct.

Current competitions

Association football

Australian rules football

Rugby

Rugby league

Other

Defunct competitions

See also 

 List of association football competitions

References

History of association football
History of Australian rules football
History of rugby union
History of rugby league
History of Canadian football
Superlatives in sports
Oldest things